Giribaile Castle is a ruined Spanish military fortification and Bienes de Interés Cultural landmark, built in the 12th century, during the etapa islámica. It situated in the vicinity of the village of Guadalén, in the town of jiennense de Vilches (Andalucía, España). It is situated on the northern edge of a plateau about 500 meters above sea level, visually controlling the valley of the río Guadalimar.

Bibliography 
 Valdecantos Dema, Rodrigo. CASTILLOS DE JAÉN: Descubre el pasado de una tierra fronteriza.  
 Olivares Barragán, Francisco. CASTILLOS DE LA PROVINCIA DE JAÉN. C.S.I.C. Jaén, 1992. 

Castles in Andalusia
Bien de Interés Cultural landmarks in the Province of Jaén (Spain)
Buildings and structures completed in the 12th century